

Service rifles

Service pistols

{| class="wikitable"
!Firearm
!Type
!Calibre
!Service
|-
|Bodeo M1889
|Revolver
|10.35mm
|1889–1945 (?)
|-
|Glisenti M1910
|Semi-Automatic
|9mm Glisenti
|1910–1945 (?)
|-
|Beretta M1923
|Semi-Automatic
|9mm Glisenti
|1923–1945 (?)
|-
|Beretta M1934
|Semi-Automatic
|.380 ACP
|1934–1951
|-
|Beretta M1951
|Semi-Automatic
|9mm Parabellum
|1951–1981
|-
|Beretta M92FS
|Semi-Automatic
|9mm Parabellum
|1981–Present
|-
|}

Weapons of Italy